Linda Joan Metheny-Mulvihill (born August 12, 1947) is a retired American artistic gymnast. She won seven gold, three silver and one bronze medal at the Pan American Games in 1967 and 1971, and served as the flag bearer for the American team in 1971. She competed at the 1964, 1968 and 1972 Olympics with the best individual result of fourth place on the balance beam in 1968, becoming the first American gymnast to qualify to an Olympic event final. Domestically she won at least 18 individual national titles. In 1985 she was inducted into the U.S. Gymnastic Hall of Fame.

Metheny started competing in 1962, and between 1964 and 1973 was a member of the national team. After the 1964 Olympics she enrolled at the University of Illinois as their only female gymnast. After retiring from competition she became a gymnastics coach working together with her husband Dick Mulvihill, and worked as an international referee. She judged at the World Cup in 2000, at the world championships in 1994, 1995, 2002 and 2003, and at the Olympic Games in 1996 and 2000. Together with her husband she has run the National Academy of Artistic Gymnastics in Eugene, Oregon, since 1973.

References

External links 
 

1947 births
Living people
American female artistic gymnasts
Gymnasts at the 1964 Summer Olympics
Gymnasts at the 1968 Summer Olympics
Gymnasts at the 1972 Summer Olympics
Olympic gymnasts of the United States
Pan American Games medalists in gymnastics
Pan American Games gold medalists for the United States
Pan American Games silver medalists for the United States
Pan American Games bronze medalists for the United States
Gymnasts at the 1967 Pan American Games
Gymnasts at the 1971 Pan American Games
Medalists at the 1967 Pan American Games
21st-century American women